Four Wheeler is the oldest magazine for 4x4 and off-road truck and SUV enthusiasts. The first issue was published in February 1962, and in 2012, the internationally read magazine celebrated its 50th anniversary. Four Wheeler focuses on new-vehicle evaluations, project vehicles, the technical aspects of building a vehicle (such as how to install aftermarket accessories and do complete engine swaps), product tests, outdoor equipment and machines, 4x4 shows and competitions, and travel and adventure.

Four Wheeler is published monthly by Motor Trend Group and headquartered in El Segundo, California.

Top Truck Challenge
The first Four Wheeler Top Truck Challenge took place in 1993, and the event, also called TTC, was held annually at the Hollister Hills State Vehicular Recreation Area near Hollister, California. The last Top Truck Challenge was held in June 2015. The original concept was to test the engineering capabilities of 4x4 vehicles, and it remained that way through its 23-year history, inviting readers "who own ‘the world’s best four wheeler’ to put up or shut up: Take us up on our Top Truck Challenge—the search for the best truck—and send in an entry," as the February 1994 issue stated.

Although competitors were selected by Four Wheeler readers, that process didn’t actually begin until 1995. Competition vehicles no longer needed to also be street legal starting with the 2004 Top Truck Challenge. Over the years, the challenges have included an obstacle course, a mini Rubicon Trail, and the Tank Trap. In 2012, Four Wheeler held the first-ever Top Truck Champions’ Challenge, pitting past Top Truck Challenge Grand Champions against one another. Segments from Top Truck Challenge have been broadcast on the Outdoor Channel.

Granville King
One of the most popular Four Wheeler writers was Granville King. He was Four Wheeler’s Baja correspondent from 1984 until the time of his death in 1989. He wrote a variety of stories for Four Wheeler, including his "From the Backcountry" series, which was an account of a life devoid of many modern trappings, but filled with backcountry adventures and mechanical tips.

Four Wheeler of the Year and Pickup Truck of the Year
Annually, Four Wheeler hands out two prestigious awards to automakers of new 4x4s, Four Wheeler of the Year and Pickup Truck of the Year. As voted on by the editors, it is a rigorous competition that began in 1974 with the Four Wheeler Achievement Award, given to the 1974 Jeep Cherokee. In 1989, pickup trucks were separated into their own contest. In 2012, Motor Trend included a behind the scenes look at the Four Wheeler of the Year and Pickup Truck of the Year competitions in an episode of "The Downshift" on the Motor Trend channel. In 2017, Four Wheeler of the Year was renamed SUV of the Year to more accurately describe the vehicles. Vehicles are evaluated in categories such as off-road performance, highway performance, mechanical and empirical data, interior, and exterior. The competition typically takes place in Southern California, covers about 1,000 miles on- and off-road, and vehicles are scored by experienced judges.   

Until 2020, when Jeep won both SUV of the Year and Pickup Truck of the Year, no manufacturer had won both SUV of the Year and Pickup Truck of the Year in the same year. 

Recipients of the awards are:

Four Wheeler/SUV of the Year
2021 GMC Yukon AT4
2020 Jeep Wrangler Rubicon EcoDiesel
2019 Jeep Wrangler Rubicon
2018 Land Rover Discovery
2017 Jeep Grand Cherokee Trailhawk 
2016 Land Rover Range Rover Sport SVR
2015 Jeep Cherokee Trailhawk
2014 Land Rover Range Rover Sport
2013 Jeep Wrangler Moab JK
2012 Jeep Wrangler Rubicon JK
2011 Jeep Grand Cherokee Overland WK2
2010 Toyota 4Runner Trail
2009 Nissan Xterra Off-Road
2008 Hummer H3 Alpha
2007 Jeep Wrangler Rubicon JK
2006 Toyota Land Cruiser
2005 Volkswagen Touareg V-10 TDI
2004 Lexus GX470 (w/Kinetic Dynamic Suspension System)
2003 Lexus GX470
2002 Jeep Grand Cherokee Overland WJ
2001 Nissan Pathfinder
2000 Chevrolet Tahoe Z71
1999 Jeep Grand Cherokee WJ
1998 Dodge Durango
1997 Jeep Cherokee XJ
1996 Jeep Grand Cherokee ZJ
1995 Land Rover Discovery
1994 Land Rover Defender 90
1993 Jeep Grand Cherokee ZJ
1992 Chevrolet K1500 Blazer
1991 Ford Explorer two-door
1990 Ford Explorer
1989 Range Rover
1988 Chevrolet K1500
1987 Nissan Pathfinder
1986 Jeep Comanche
1985 Toyota SR5
1984 Jeep Cherokee XJ
1983 Chevrolet S-Blazer
1982 Dodge Power Ram 50
1981 Toyota SR5
1980 Ford Bronco
1979 Chevrolet LUV
1978 Ford Bronco
1977 Dodge Macho Power Wagon
1976 International Harvester Traveler
1975 Chevrolet Blazer
1974 Jeep Cherokee

Pickup Truck of the Year
2021 Ram 1500 TRX
2020 Jeep Gladiator
2019 Ram 1500 Rebel
2018 Chevy Colorado ZR2
2017 Ford F-150 Raptor
2016 Ram 1500 Rebel
2015 Ram Power Wagon
2014 Chevrolet Silverado 1500 Z71
2013 Ram 1500 Outdoorsman
2012 Ram Power Wagon
2011 Ford F-150 SVT Raptor 6.2L
2010 Ram Power Wagon
2009 Hummer H3T
2008 Ford Super Duty FX4
2007 Chevrolet Avalanche Z71
2006 Dodge Ram TRX4
2005 Dodge Ram Power Wagon
2004 Nissan Titan
2003 GMC Sierra Quadrasteer
2002 Dodge Ram Quad Cab
2001 Toyota Tacoma Double Cab TRD
2000 Dodge Dakota Quad Cab
1999 Chevrolet Silverado Z71
1998 Toyota Tacoma XtraCab TRD
1997 Dodge Dakota Club Cab
1996 Toyota Tacoma XtraCab
1995 Ford F-250 SuperCab Power Stroke
1994 Chevrolet S-10 ZR2
1993 Ford Ranger SuperCab
1992 Dodge Dakota Club Cab
1991 GMC K2500 HD
1990 Mitsubishi Mighty Max

Editors
Ken Brubaker: 2016-present
Christian Hazel: 2014-2016
John Cappa: 2011–2014
Douglas McColloch: 2005-2011
Jon Thompson: 2000-2005
Mark Williams: 1999-2000
John Stewart: 1986-1999
David M. Cohen: 1986
Rich Johnson (Senior Editor): 1984-1985
Dianne Jacob (Executive Editor): 1983-1984
Julian G. Schmidt: 1982
Dennis Adler: 1980-1981
Bill Sanders: 1971-1979 and 1981–1982
Lou Kjose: 1971
Robert Leif: 1969
Robert Ames: 1963-1971

Books
Four Wheeler Chassis & Suspension Handbook (2004)

External links
Official Four Wheeler Website

References

Motor Trend Group
Automobile magazines published in the United States
Monthly magazines published in the United States
Transport magazines published in the United States
Magazines established in 1962
Magazines published in California
Turner Sports